School District 63 Saanich is a school district in the Canadian province of British Columbia. It covers the area north of Victoria on the Saanich Peninsula. This includes part of the District of Saanich, as well as the Municipalities of Central Saanich, North Saanich, and the township Sidney.  Saanich offers a variety of programs including an international student program and continuing education.

History

The history of the Saanich School District predates the province of British Columbia. The first Saanich School District was formed on June 25, 1869, while the area was still part of the Colony of Vancouver Island.

Schools

See also
List of school districts in British Columbia

Saanich, British Columbia
63